Anna Shchagina (born 7 December 1991) is a Russian middle-distance runner. She competed in the 800 metres event at the 2014 IAAF World Indoor Championships.

References

1991 births
Living people
Russian female middle-distance runners
Place of birth missing (living people)
World Athletics Championships athletes for Russia